One George Street is a , 23-storey class-A office building skyscraper in Raffles Place, Singapore.

The High Commission of Canada currently occupies the 11th floor of the office building.

References

Further reading
''Wong Yun Chii (2005), Singapore 1:1 – City, Urban Redevelopment Authority,

External links

CapitaLand
Skidmore, Owings & Merrill buildings
Skyscraper office buildings in Singapore
Office buildings completed in 2005
Downtown Core (Singapore)
Raffles Place